Lou Jacobi (born Louis Harold Jacobovitch; December 28, 1913October 23, 2009) was a Canadian character actor.

Life and early career
Jacobi was born Louis Harold Jacobovitch in Toronto, Canada, to Joseph and Fay Jacobovitch.

Jacobi began acting as a boy, making his stage debut in 1924 at a Toronto theater, playing a violin prodigy in The Rabbi and the Priest.  After working as the drama director of the Toronto Y.M.H.A., the social director at a summer resort, a stand-up comic in Canada's equivalent of the Borscht Belt, and the entertainment at various weddings and bachelor parties, Jacobi moved to London to work on the stage, appearing in Guys and Dolls and Pal Joey.  Jacobi made his Broadway debut in 1955 in The Diary of Anne Frank playing Hans van Daan, the less-than-noble occupant of the Amsterdam attic where the Franks were hiding, and reprised the role in the 1959 film version.  Other Broadway performances included Paddy Chayefsky’s The Tenth Man (1959), Woody Allen’s Don’t Drink the Water (1966), and Neil Simon’s debut play Come Blow Your Horn (1961), in which he portrayed the playboy protagonist’s disappointed father. His reading of the film line "Aha!" stuck with the Times columnist William Safire so vividly that he cited it when writing about the meaning of the word 40 years later.

Screen career
Jacobi's film debut was in the 1953 British comedy, Is Your Honeymoon Really Necessary? with the country's blond sex symbol of the day, Diana Dors. Other notable films in which he appeared include, The Diary of Anne Frank (1959), Irma la Douce (1963), Penelope (1966), Everything You Always Wanted to Know About Sex* (*But Were Afraid to Ask) (1972) as Sam Musgrave, a middle-aged married man experimenting with women's clothes, Arthur (1981) as the lucky florist, My Favorite Year (1982) as Benjy's unsophisticated Uncle Morty, and in Amazon Women on the Moon (1987), as a man named Murray who got zapped into the television and is wandering throughout sketches looking for his wife. In Barry Levinson's Avalon (1990), in a semi-dramatic role, as one of four Russian brothers (elders) trying to build a future in Baltimore in the early 20th century, with the memorable comic relief catchphrase, "You cut the turkey!?" after he would notoriously arrive late to family Thanksgiving dinner, every year. His final film role was I.Q. (1994), playing philosopher/mathematician Kurt Gödel.
 
He guest-starred on such television shows as Playhouse 90, Too Close for Comfort, Tales from the Darkside, Love, American Style, That Girl, Sanford and Son, Barney Miller and The Man from U.N.C.L.E., and was a regular on The Dean Martin Show. In the summer of 1976, Jacobi was the star of a CBS comedy series Ivan the Terrible, in which he played a Russian headwaiter living with nine other people in a small Moscow apartment. Comics Christopher Hewett, Phil Leeds, Alan Cauldwell and, in her TV series debut, Nana Visitor (here billed under her birth name, Nana Tucker). Harvey Korman appeared as a Soviet bureaucrat in an uncredited cameo at the close of each episode. The executive producer of the short-lived series was noted comic Alan King. The comedy series only lasted 5 episodes.

In 1999, Jacobi, who was 85 at the time, was inducted into Canada's Walk of Fame. On the occasion of the dedication, film critic Roger Ebert interviewed Jacobi, later writing, "I look at Lou, and I’m not afraid to be 85, if I can get there in Lou's style."

Personal life
Jacobi was married to Ruth Ludwin from 1957 until her death in 2004. Jacobi died on October 23, 2009, of natural causes, at his home in Manhattan. He was 95. He was survived by his brother, Avrom Jacobovitch, and sister, Rae Jacobovitch, both of Toronto.

Jacobi was one of the voice inspirations for the Futurama character Dr. Zoidberg.

Filmography

References

Further reading
 Oderman, Stuart, Talking to the Piano Player 2. BearManor Media, 2009; .

External links

 
 

1913 births
2009 deaths
Canadian expatriate male actors in the United States
Canadian male film actors
Canadian male stage actors
Canadian male television actors
Male actors from New York City
Male actors from Toronto
20th-century Canadian male actors